Martigny is a commune in the Seine-Maritime department in the Normandy region in northern France.

Geography
Large woods surround the commune to the south and west, with lakes and marshland to the north and east.

Population

Places of interest
 The church of St.Martin, dating from the thirteenth century.
 The nineteenth-century chateau.
 An ancient river bridge.

See also
Communes of the Seine-Maritime department

References

Communes of Seine-Maritime